Daqiao Subdistrict is a subdistrict in Yixiu District, Anqing, Anhui province, China. , it has 12 residential communities and 4 villages under its administration.

See also 
 List of township-level divisions of Anhui

References 

Township-level divisions of Anhui
Anqing
Subdistricts of the People's Republic of China